I Rodond is a mountain of the Swiss Lepontine Alps, located west of San Bernardino in the canton of Graubünden. It lies north of the Pass di Passit, on the range between Val Calanca and Val Mesolcina.

References

External links
 I Rodond on Hikr

Mountains of the Alps
Mountains of Switzerland
Mountains of Graubünden
Lepontine Alps
Two-thousanders of Switzerland